The Electoral district of Zeehan was a single-member electoral district of the Tasmanian House of Assembly. It was based in the mining town of Zeehan in the West Coast region of Tasmania.

The seat was created in a redistribution ahead of the 1900 election out of Lyell, and was abolished when the Tasmanian parliament adopted the Hare–Clark electoral system in 1909. Its final member, James Ogden, successfully stood for the multi-member seat of Darwin (now known as Braddon) and retained political office for 13 years.

Members for Zeehan

References
 
 
 Parliament of Tasmania (2006). The Parliament of Tasmania from 1956

Zeehan
Zeehan